Arno Klare (born 1 February 1952) is a German politician of the Social Democratic Party (SPD) who served as a member of the Bundestag from the state of North Rhine-Westphalia from 2013 until 2021.

Political career 
Klare became a member of the Bundestag after the 2013 German federal election. He was a member of the Committee on Transport and Digital Infrastructure.

In November 2020, Klare announced he wil not be in next Bundestag in 2021 German federal election.

References

External links 

  
 Bundestag biography 

1952 births
Living people
Members of the Bundestag for North Rhine-Westphalia
Members of the Bundestag 2017–2021
Members of the Bundestag 2013–2017
Members of the Bundestag for the Social Democratic Party of Germany